"O Yeah" is the debut single of Australian pop rock band End of Fashion, taken from their 2005 self-titled debut album. The song reuses the riff from the song "Where Is My Mind?" by American alternative rock band Pixies. Released in Australia on 18 July 2005, it peaked at number 21 on the Australian ARIA Singles Chart. It was also a top-20 hit in New Zealand, where it reached number 14 in September 2005.

Music video
The Ben Quinn directed music video won the ARIA Award for Best Video at the ARIA Music Awards of 2005.

Similarity to the Pixies' "Where is My Mind?"
End of Fashion have been criticised for their uncredited copying of the guitar riff from the Pixies song "Where Is My Mind?" for "O Yeah". Rockus Online Magazine reviewer Jonathon Miller called the song "disturbingly Pixies-ish" and went on to write:
"End of Fashion are having no problem appealing to the 95% of people that haven't heard (and still remember) the Pixies' "Where Is My Mind?" and have never experienced a truly exciting live show, and if that's what the band is aiming for, then they are a complete success."

Track listing
Australian CD single

Charts

References

2005 singles
End of Fashion songs
ARIA Award-winning songs
2005 songs
EMI Records singles